The following is a list of sects involved in Gnosticism:

Ancient

Proto-Gnosticism
 Maghāriya
 Thomasines

Judean-Israelite Gnosticism
 Elkesaites
 Mandaeism
 Samaritan Baptist sects

Syrian-Egyptic Gnosticism
 Bardesanites
 Basilidians
 Hermeticism
 Satornilians
 Sethians
 Valesians
Valentianism
 Heracleonites
 Ptolemaeans

Persian Gnosticism
 Manichaeism
 Al-Dayhuri's Sect
 Albanenses
 Astati
 Audianism
 Shinang's Sect

Unclassified Christian Gnosticism
 Cerdonians
 Marcionism  
 Apelliacos
 Lucianists
 Colorbasians
 Dositheans (could be offshoot of Simonianism or proto-Gnostic)
 Justinians
 Simonians
 Menandrians

Others
 Abelonians
 Agapetae
 Alogians
 Angelici
 Antitactae
 Aquarii
 Archontics
 Ascodroutes
 Barbeliotae
 Borborites 
 Coddians (also called Koddians) 
 Levitics (also called Levitici)
 Phibionites
 Stratiotici
 Cainites 
 Carpocratians 
 Cerinthians
 Adamites (also called Adamians)
 Marcellianas
 Cleobians 
 Docetae
 Elcesaites
 Encratites
Apotactics (also called Apostolics)
Severians
 Marcosians
 Messalians
 Nicolaism
 Ophites 
 Naassenes
 Perates
 Priscillianism
 Quintillians, Montanist sect that may have come under Gnostic influence
 Secundians
 Seleucians

Middle Ages

 Athinganoi
 Bagnolians
 Bogomils
 Bosnian Church
 Cathars
 Black Brotherhood
 Credentes
 Pasagians
 Pataria
 Novgorodians - the owners of the Novgorod Codex; it is likely that the owners of the codex were dualistic like the Bogomils
 Paulicianism (However the dualism of Paulicianism is not certain)
 Picards (Neo-Adamites)
 Tondrakians

Modern era
 Mandaeism

Neo-Gnostic

 Anthroposophy
 The Church of St Mary & St John
 Ecclesia Gnostica
 Ecclesia Gnostica Catholica
 Ecclesia Gnostica Mysteriorum
 Ecclesia Pistis Sophia
 Eglise Gnostique
 Gnostic Society
 Holy Order of Mans (Quasi-Gnostic)
 Johannite Church
 Liberal Catholic Union
 Martinism
 Muckers
 Neo-Luciferian Church
 Order of the Nazorean Essenes (influenced by Gnosticism)
 Rosicrucianism
 Samael Aun Weor
 Society of Novus Spiritus
 Theosophy
Angelici Christian Church

See also
 Gnostic church – a Gnostic religious organization

Footnotes

References
 Blunt, John Henry. Dictionary of Sects, Heresies, Ecclesiastical Parties, and Schools of Religious Thought. Rivingtons. 1874.

Gnosticism